SuiteCRM is a free open-source Customer Relationship Management application for servers that is written in PHP.

It is a software fork of the popular customer relationship management (CRM) system from SugarCRM and its base is built on the last open-source SugarCRM release. The SuiteCRM project began when SugarCRM decided to stop the development of its open-source version. (Open-source CRM is often used as an alternative to proprietary CRM software from major corporations such as HubSpot, Salesforce, and Microsoft Dynamics CRM applications.)

It was originally released on October 21, 2013, as version 7.0 and provides upgrade paths for existing SugarCRM users. It is a greatly extended version of SugarCRM which also contains many additional security fixes that are not available in SugarCRM. It has been downloaded more than 800,000 times since the original release and a community of nearly 90,000 developers and collaborators has joined the project.

It has been adopted by NHS (National Health Service) England's Code4Health programme which seeks to foster open-source in the NHS in England.

SuiteCRM comprises the last release of the SugarCRM Community Edition plus the following additional modules:

Products
Quotes
Contracts
Invoices
PDF Templates
Workflow
Reporting
Search
Events
Google Maps
Teams Security
Portal
Responsive Theme
Outlook plugin
Surveys

In addition to the new modules, extensive bug fixes and many enhancements to the core functionality have been made. There have been over fifty updates since the original project was released. A six-month release cycle is maintained with bug fix and security releases being made available between major releases.

Modules 

 Accounts
 Contacts
 Opportunities
 Leads
 Calendar
 Calls
 Meetings
 Email Templates
 Emails
 Emails  LTS
 Tasks
 Notes
 Documents
 Targets
 Target Lists
 Campaigns
 Surveys
 Bugs
 Cases
 Projects
 Spots
 Employees

Advanced Modules 
 PDF Templates
 Knowledge Base
 Sales
 Workflows
 Workflow Calculated Fields
 Cases with Portal
 Events
 Reports
 Reschedule

Awards 
SuiteCRM won the BOSSIE Award 2015 and BOSSIE Award 2016 for the world's best Open Source CRM. Infoworld, the curators of the BOSSIE awards stated that "In little more than a year, SuiteCRM has inspired the community and emerged as a new leader in open source CRM." The award had been won by SugarCRM for the previous 8 years.

See also 

 SugarCRM

References

External links 
 

Free customer relationship management software
Software using the GNU AGPL license